The 2011 Arlington mayoral election was held on May 14, 2011 to elect the mayor of Arlington, Texas. The election was officially nonpartisan. It saw the reelection of incumbent mayor Robert Cluck.

If no candidate had obtained a majority of the vote, a runoff would have been held. However, since there was a winner, there was no runoff.

Results

References

Arlington mayoral
Arlington
2011
Non-partisan elections